Fille du peuple (1920) is a French silent film directed by Camille de Morlhon and featuring Charles de Rochefort.

Cast
Suzanne Herval   
Charles de Rochefort   
Jean Peyrière

External links 

1920 films
French silent films
French black-and-white films
1920 drama films
French drama films
Silent drama films
1920s French films